The Aston Martin DBR9 is a racing car built by Aston Martin Racing, debuting in 2005 and racing actively in international sportscar racing until the end of GT1 category in 2011. The name DBR9 is derived from the original 24 Hours of Le Mans-winning DBR1 car, named for then-owner David Brown, which not only won the 24 Hour race in 1959 but also the World Sportscar title. The car is most famous for taking two LMGT1 class wins at Le Mans 24 Hours (2007 and 2008) by the Aston Martin Racing factory team.

Development
Based on the Aston Martin DB9 road car, the DBR9 retains the chassis, engine block, and cylinder heads of the road car's V12 engine. The rest of the car is re-engineered for high performance competition use. The DBR9's bodywork is a blend of optimum aerodynamic performance and the styling of the DB9 road car. All the body panels are constructed from carbon fibre composite (except the roof) to minimize the weight of the car. To complete the aerodynamic body, the bottom of the car is flat all the way from the front to the rear diffuser. To optimise rear downforce a carbon fibre wing has been added.

For the 2007 24 Hours of Le Mans, Prodrive made modifications to the DBR9 design to not only improve performance, but also to increase driver comfort in the cockpit.  Due to new regulations put into place by Le Mans organizers, the DBR9 required the installation of an air conditioning unit, to prevent overstressing drivers.  Prodrive went further by putting a heat-resistant white roof on all new cars to assist in keeping cockpit temperatures down.  Performance modifications included the removal of two, now immaterial, cooling vents from the bonnet of the car.

Racing history

The DBR9 won the Sebring 12 Hours for its LMGT1 category in 2005, but came third in Le Mans 24 Hour behind arch-rivals Corvette Racing due to fuel problems.  In 2006, the DBR9 was unable to repeat its success at Sebring, finishing second behind a Corvette.  A similar situation occurred at Le Mans as well.  Despite not winning Sebring and Le Mans, Aston Martin Racing regularly challenged Corvette Racing for victory in the rest of the American Le Mans Series schedule, with victories at Lime Rock Park, Miller Motorsports Park, Mosport, Petit Le Mans, and Mazda Raceway Laguna Seca.  Aston Martin capped their 2006 ALMS season by finishing second in the GT1 Manufacturer's Championship, earning the factory team an automatic entry to the 2007 24 Hours of Le Mans.

In the Le Mans Endurance Series, Larbre Compétition took the Team's Championship, with victories at the 1000 Kilometres of Istanbul and 1000 Kilometres of the Nurburgring, a second-place finish at the 1000 Kilometres of Jarama, and a fifth-place finish at the 1000 Kilometres of Donington.

The DBR9 came into the 2006 FIA GT Championship being title contender favourites, but the season was somewhat lacklustre with only two victories at Mugello and Dubai. The Phoenix Racing Aston Martin DBR9 narrowly missed out on victory at the 24 Hours of Spa-Francorchamps.  BMS Scuderia Italia cited a problem with finding the right tyre compound with their Pirellis as the factor for their lack of success.

For 2007, Aston Martin was finally able to overcome their woes at Le Mans, securing the GT1 class victory for the #009 Aston Martin Racing DBR9.  Larbre's DBR9 would also manage third place in class.  The teams running DBR9s managed to finish every car entered. To celebrate that historic victory, Aston Martin built a very limited edition of the DB9 called the DB9 LM (Le Mans), which featured a unique color, called the Sarthe Silver (named to the track where the Le Mans racing is held), also DBS clear taillights, specific wheels, Magnum silver meshes and crossbar, Sport Pack as standard, a specific interior with red stitching and tertre rouge facia trim. All cars were individually numbered and they are very sought-after today.

Later in 2007, Aston Martin launched another limited production, the DBS road car which has many styling cues taken from the DBR9 in conjunction with the James Bond film Casino Royale.  Aston Martin Racing's DBR9s raced 2006 and 2007 under the numbers 007 and 009, in honour of James Bond. Unlike the DB9 LM, which was an ultra-exclusive (only 60 built) cosmetic package, the DBS brought many technology from the racing world. A lot of carbon fiber and aluminium used in the body, a serious power upgrade to the engine and a new interior.

In 2008, while Larbre and Scuderia Italia moved on from Aston Martin, Prodrive continued to field a two-car factory team at the 24 Hours of Le Mans. The #009 numbered car, with the new Gulf Oil sponsored paint scheme, driven by Darren Turner, Antonio Garcia and David Brabham, won its class.

A Le Mans-spec DBR9 participated in the 2009 Super GT season, marking Aston Martin's debut in the series.

Teams

The Aston Martin DBR9 was last run by two customers team in the FIA GT1 World Championship. In the past, there were up to three factory teams and the car has also been sold to customers for private use in various racing series, such as the American Le Mans Series, Le Mans Series, FIA GT Championship, FFSA GT Championship, and Super GT.

Past factory teams
  Aston Martin Racing, run by Prodrive (2005–2008)
  Aston Martin Racing Larbre, run by Larbre Compétition (2005–2007)
  Aston Martin Racing BMS, run by BMS Scuderia Italia (2005–2007)

Past customer teams
  Team Modena, formerly Cirtek Racing (2005–2008)
  Jetalliance Racing, formerly RaceAlliance (2006–2009)
  Phoenix Racing (2006–2007)
  Barwell Motorsports (2007)
  Gigawave Motorsport (2007–2009)
  Bell Motorsports (2008)
  Strakka Racing, also under the Vitaphone Racing banner (2008)
  Team Nova (2009)
  Hexis AMR (2010 - 2011)
  Young Driver AMR, run by Fischer Racing (2010 - 2011)

Chassis
A total of 16 DBR9 chassis were made including a few upgraded chassis' over the five years it has raced so far.

Chassis history
 DBR9/1
The first DBR9 chassis to be built and raced at Le Mans in 2005 under Aston Martin Racing, qualified on pole and finished 3rd in class.  In 2005, it also competed in the 12 Hours of Sebring, winning the GT1 class and finishing fourth overall. In 2006, Larbre Compétition only raced this chassis at the Le Mans Series but, in 2007 they raced it in the FFSA GT Championship and the 2007 24 Hours of Le Mans.

This chassis competed in the 2010 FIA GT1 World Championship season and 2011 FIA GT1 World Championship season with the Hexis AMR team, eventually winning the 2011 Team's championship.

 DBR9/2
Another factory Aston Martin Racing DBR9 that only picked up one class win and best overall finish of second.  Raced in the 2011 FIA GT1 World Championship season for Hexis AMR as Car number 4.

 DBR9/3
Entered by Aston Martin Racing for the 2006 24 Hours of Le Mans and competing in the full 2006 American Le Mans Series season and got two class wins. Also raced by Larbre Compétition at the 2007 24 Hours of Le Mans.

 DBR9/4
Raced by Team Modena in 2006 and then in 2008 by Strakka Racing who raced at the 2008 24 Hours of Le Mans under the Vitaphone Racing Team banner. Achieved one class win in the LMS in 2006.

 DBR9/5
Raced by Bell Motorsports in the 2008 American Le Mans Series season. No class wins, 4 podiums out of 6 races entered.

 DBR9/6
Raced by BMS Scuderia Italia under the name Aston Martin Racing BMS. Raced a full 2007 FIA GT Championship season.

 DBR9/7
Another Aston Martin Racing BMS car. No podiums or class wins despite entering a full 2006 FIA GT Championship season.

 DBR9/8
Raced by Aston Martin Racing in the 2006 American Le Mans Series season and the 2008 24 Hours of Le Mans where it won in the GT1 class. Also raced by BMS Scuderia Italia in the 2007 FIA GT Championship season.

 DBR9/9
Raced by BMS Scuderia Italia at the 2006 and 2007 FIA GT Championship seasons where it picked no wins. Written off at the 24 Hours of Spa in 2007.

 DBR9/10
Only raced at the 2007 24 Hours of Le Mans where it won in the GT1 class and finished fifth overall.

 DBR9/101
Raced under privateer teams under Russian Age Racing who also raced alongside Cirtek Motorsport in 2005 and 2006 who picked up two wins. It was then owned by Team Modena who raced it in 2007 and 2008 including appearances at Le Mans, and Le Mans Series, gaining 4 victories.

 DBR9/102
Scheduled to race at the 2006 Mil Milhas Brasileiras under Capuava Racing Team but had engine problems in practice.

 DBR9/103
Only raced by Jetalliance Racing from 2006 right up to the 2009 24 Hours of Le Mans. In the three years it picked up 4 wins.

 DBR9/104
Raced by Phoenix racing in a full 2006 FIA GT Championship season and only raced once in 2007. It only achieved one win but seven podiums.

 DBR9/105
Another DBR9 raced by Jetalliance Racing including three wins and four podiums in the 2008 FIA GT Championship season.

 DBR9/106
Raced by Gigawave Motorsport in 2008 and picked up five podiums. It was meant to race at the 2009 24 Hours of Le Mans but Gigawave ditched the DBR9 to focus on the Nissan GT-R GT1 programme. The car was used in Gigawave's first Le Man Series race of 2009, the final round at Silverstone, where it won the GT1 class.

 DBR9/109
Built for the 2010 FIA GT1 World Championship season; it raced in the early part of the season. It was also entered for the 1000 km of Spa, where it was extensively damaged in an accident.

Gallery

References

External links

 Aston Martin Racing Official Website
 DBR9 Technical review 
 Aston Martin Picture Gallery
  Aston Martin DBR 9 serial number on Endurance-Series

Grand tourer racing cars
DBR9
24 Hours of Le Mans race cars